Steve Edge (born 2 November 1972) is an English actor, writer and former stand-up comedian. He is most famous for his work on Starlings, Phoenix Nights, The Cup, The Visit, Peep Show, Benidorm and the satirical magazine show Star Stories.

Early life and stand-up

Edge was born in Cannock, Staffordshire, England. He attended Stafford College and the University of Salford. He began his career in 1997 and from then until 2004 worked as a stand-up comedian. From March–November 2004 Steve, Paddy McGuinness, Archie Kelly and Janice Connolly toured a live stand-up show "Jumping on the Bandwagon" in reference to the success of Phoenix Nights. The final show of the tour and the last time he did stand-up was at the Winter Gardens, Blackpool. Edge is most famous for playing Alan, one half of double-act Les Alanos with Les played by Toby Foster in That Peter Kay Thing, Peter Kay's Phoenix Nights  and Max and Paddy's Road to Nowhere. He reprised the role in 2015 for Phoenix Nights LIVE where the cast performed 16 shows at Manchester Arena and raised £5 million for Comic Relief.

Writing and other work

Edge was a programme associate/writer on 8 Out of 10 Cats from 2007 to 2011.

He was script editor for the BBC2 comedy The Cup in which he also starred as the lead, Terry McConnell.

In 2009 he wrote the BBC1 show Walk on the Wild Side along with Jason Manford as well as adding the voices to the show, most notably the Marmot repeatedly shouting "Alan".

In 2009 he wrote and narrated BBC3's Almost Famous III its 2010 sequel Almost Famous IV.

In 2002 he starred in a series of improvised adverts directed by Graham Linehan, for the now defunct ITV Sport Channel.

He starred as a hapless undertaker in the Elbow promo for the song "Not a Job".

Edge is the creator and co-writer of the series Starlings on Sky1 along with Matt King.

He regularly joins Jason Manford on Manford's Sunday morning radio show on Absolute Radio.

Personal life
Edge has moved to Hastings. Before that, he lived in Didsbury, a suburb of Manchester, since 1995 and revealed on Soccer AM that he is a Wolverhampton Wanderers season ticket holder who sits in the Stan Cullis Stand.  He was married in August 2014, with friend and colleague Jason Manford as best man.  He is godfather to Manford's twin daughters.

Filmography

Film

Television

Awards and nominations

 Finalist in the 1998 BBC New Comedy Awards competition at the Edinburgh Festival
 Nominated in 2004 for the Manchester Evening News Theatre Awards – Best Comedy for the "Jumping on the Bandwagon" Tour
 Nominated in 2005 North West Comedy Awards – Best Comedic Performance on Film & TV for I'm with Stupid
 Nominated in 2007 RTS Awards Best Performance in a Comedy for The Visit
 Nominated in 2008 British Comedy Awards Best Male Comedy Newcomer for The Cup
 Won in 2010 RTS Awards Best Performance in a Comedy for Scallywagga

References

External links

1972 births
Living people
People from Cannock
English stand-up comedians
English male television actors
Alumni of the University of Salford
English male comedians